Cecidochares caliginosa is a species of tephritid or fruit flies in the genus Cecidochares of the family Tephritidae.

Distribution
United States, Mexico.

References

Tephritinae
Insects described in 1960
Diptera of North America